Eliezer ("God is my help") was the name of at least three biblical personalities.

Eliezer may also refer to:

Rabbinic sages

Tannaim
Eliezer ben Hurcanus, Tanna (sage) of 1st and 2nd century Judea
Eliezer ben Jacob I, Tanna of the 1st century
Eliezer ben Jacob II, Tanna of the 2nd century
Eleazar ben Judah of Bartota, Tanna of the first and second centuries

Tosafists
Eliezer ben Joel HaLevi (1140–1225), Rabbinic scholar in Germany
Eliezer ben Yose Haglili (2nd century), Jewish rabbi who lived in Judea
Eliezer ben Samuel (died 1175), French author of the halachic work Sefer Yereim
Eliezer of Touques (13th century), French tosafist

Other people with first name Eliezer
Eliézer Alfonzo (born 1979), American baseball player
Eliezer Adler (1866–1949), English Jewish community founder
Eliezer Avtabi (born 1938), Israeli politician
Eliezer ben Elijah Ashkenazi (1512–1585), Talmudist
Eliezer ben Isaac ha-Gadol, 11th-century German rabbi
Eliezer ben Nathan (1090–1170), Rishon
Eliezer Ben-Yehuda (1858–1922), Hebrew lexicographer
Eliezer Berkovits (1908–1992), rabbi
Eliezer Berland (born 1937), Israeli rosh yeshiva
Eliezer Cadet (born 1897), Haitian Vodou priest
Eliezer Cogan (1762–1855), English scholar and divine
Eliezer Cohen (born 1934), Israeli politician
Eliezer Yehuda Finkel (b. 1879) (1879–1965), LIthuanian rabbi
Eliezer Yehuda Finkel (b. 1965), Israeli rabbi
Eliezer Kahana (?–?), 18th-century Jewish preacher
Eliezer Melamed (born 1961), Israeli rabbi and rosh yeshiva
Eliezer Mizrahi (born 1945), Israeli politician
Eliezer Moses (born 1946), Israeli politician
Eliezer Marom (born 1955), Israeli Navy commander
Eleazar of Worms (1176-1238), Talmudist
Eliezer Palchinsky (1912–2007), rosh yeshiva
Eliezer Papo (1785–1826), Bulgarian rabbi and author
Eliezer Peri (1902–1970), Israeli politician
Eliezer Zusia Portugal (1898–1982), first Skulener Rebbe
Eliezer Poupko (1886–1961), Russian rabbi
Eliezer Preminger (1920–2001), Israeli politician
Eliezer Pugh (1814–1903), Welsh philanthropist
Eliezer Rafaeli (born 1926), Israeli founding President of the University of Haifa
Eliezer Rivlin (born 1942), Israeli judge
Eliezer Ronen (1931–2016), Israeli politician
Eliezer Sandberg (born 1962), Israeli politician
Eliezer Schweid (born 1929), Israeli scholar
Eliezer Sherbatov (born 1991), Canadian-Israeli ice hockey player
Eliezer Shkedi (born 1957), CEO of El Al Airlines
Eliezer Shostak (1911–2001), Israeli politician
Eliezer Silver (1882–1968), American rabbinic leader
Eleazar Sukenik (1889–1953), Israeli archeologist
Eliezer Waldenberg (1915–2006), rabbi and dayan, known as the Tzitz Eliezer
Eliezer Waldman (born 1937), Israeli rabbi and politician
Eliezer Weishoff (born 1938), Israeli artist
Elie Wiesel (1928–2016), Jewish-American professor, political activist, and author
Eliezer Williams (1754–1820), Welsh clergyman and genealogist
Eliezer Yudkowsky (born 1979), American decision theorist
L. L. Zamenhof (1859–1917), Polish-Jewish doctor, linguist, and creator of Esperanto
Eliezer Zussman-Sofer (1830–1903), Hungarian rabbi

People with last name Eliezer
Christie Jayaratnam Eliezer (1918–2001), mathematician, physicist and academic

Other uses
Yad Eliezer, a poverty-relief organization in Israel

Hebrew masculine given names